Molecular Biology is a scientific journal which covers a wide scope of problems related to molecular, cell, and computational biology including genomics, proteomics, bioinformatics, molecular virology and immunology, molecular development biology, and molecular evolution. Molecular Biology publishes reviews, mini-reviews, experimental, and theoretical works, short communications and hypotheses. In addition, the journal publishes book reviews and meeting reports. The journal also publishes special issues devoted to most rapidly developing branches of physical-chemical biology and to the most outstanding scientists on the occasion of their anniversary birthdays. The journal is published in English and Russian versions by Nauka.

External links 
 

Molecular and cellular biology journals
Multilingual journals
Publications with year of establishment missing
Nauka academic journals
English-language journals
Russian-language journals
Springer Science+Business Media academic journals